The Men's sprint competition at the Biathlon World Championships 2020 was held on 15 February 2020 at 14:45 local time.

Results

References

Men's sprint